Hotan Kungang Airport  is an airport serving Hotan, a city in the autonomous region of Xinjiang in China.

Facilities

Airlines and destinations

See also
 List of airports in the People's Republic of China

References

External links
 
 

Airports in Xinjiang
Hotan